Cypress Gardens is a rural locality in the Toowoomba Region, Queensland, Australia.

Geography 
The Gore Highway forms the northern boundary of the locality.

The land use is rural residential with large acreage blocks.

History 
When the subdivision of approx  was established, it was named Condamine Country, but the name was thought inappropriate as there was no connection with the Condamine River. So it was named Cypress Gardens after the cypress pines in the area.

Education 
There are no schools in Cypress Gardens. The nearest primary and secondary school to Year 10 is in Millmerran and the nearest secondary school to Year 12 in is Pittsworth.

References 

Toowoomba Region
Localities in Queensland